Eileen Essell (8 October 1922 – 15 February 2015) was an English actress, noted in part for not beginning her screen acting career until the age of 79.

She retired from stage acting in 1958 following her marriage to playwright and actor Gerard McLarnon. She later earned a living as a teacher at the Central School of Music and Drama and the City University. After the death of her husband in 1997, a family friend lured her back on stage for a play he was producing. Although she had acted onstage in the 1940s/1950s, her first screen performance was in an episode of Doctors. She later appeared in The Bill, Doc Martin, Holby City, Hustle, Casualty, Ideal and Sensitive Skin, among other episodes. She guest starred as Christine in the episode "From Out of the Rain" in season 2 of the BBC spin-off show Torchwood. On film, she is best remembered for the role of Mrs. Connelly in Duplex.

A widow, Essell died on 15 February 2015, aged 92. She was survived by her son, Fergus McLarnon.

Filmography

Television

References

External links

Listed under "In Memoriam" 

1922 births
2015 deaths
20th-century English actresses
21st-century English actresses
English stage actresses
English television actresses